Wushu was both a men's and women's event at the 2009 Southeast Asian Games in Vientianne, Laos held from December 13 to December 17, 2009.

Medal summary

Medalists

Men's taolu

Men's sanshou

Women's taolu

Women's Sanshou

Events

Men

Changquan
December 14 – Changquan 
December 16 – Gunshu

Nanquan
December 15 – Nanquan 
December 16 – Nangun

Taijiquan
December 14 – Taijiquan
December 16 – Taijijian

Duilian (Barehand)
December 13 – Final

Duilian (Weapon)
December 13 – Final

Sanshou – 48 Kg
Quartel Final – December 13

Semi Final – December 15

Final – December 17

Sanshou – 52 Kg
Quartel Final – December 13

Semi Final – December 16

Final – December 17

Sanshou – 56 Kg
Semi Final – December 14

Final – December 17

Sanshou – 60 Kg
Quartel Final – December 13

Semi Final – December 15

Final – December 17

Sanshou – 65 Kg
Semi Final – December 14

Final – December 17

Sanshou – 70 Kg 
December 14

December 16

December 17

Women

Changquan
December 14 – Jianshu
December 15 – Changquan

Nanquan
December 14 – Nanquan
December 15 – Nandao

Taijiquans/Taijijian
December 15 – Taijiquan
December 16 – Taijijian

Duilian (Barehand)
December 13 – Final

Duilian (Weapon)
December 13 – Final

Sanshou – 45 Kg
Semi Final – December 16

Final –

Sanshou – 48 Kg
Quartel Final – December 13

Semi Final – December 15

Final –

Sanshou – 52 Kg
December 14

December 15

December 17

Sanshou – 56 Kg
December 14

December 16

December 17

Sanshou – 60 Kg
December 14

December 16

December 17

External links
Official Website of the 25th Southeast Asian Games Vientiane 2009

2009 Southeast Asian Games events
2009
2009 in wushu (sport)